Flyjet was a charter airline based at London Luton Airport, United Kingdom. It was a subsidiary of Silverjet, which is licensed for worldwide charter operations. It operated from Manchester Airport and  Newcastle Airport to Mediterranean holiday destinations, as well as to the Canary Islands,.

The company held a United Kingdom Civil Aviation Authority Type A Operating Licence, and was permitted to carry passengers, cargo and mail on aircraft with 20 or more seats.

Flyjet ceased operations from 31 October 2007.

History 

The Airline was established in 2002 and started operations in June 2003. It was owned by Mike Hawkins (49.9%) and Shaun Dewey (49.9%) and operated from London Gatwick Airport, Newcastle International Airport and Manchester Ringway Airport. SilverJet acquired Flyjet in October 2006. The Flyjet London Gatwick base was then closed and Head Office and Operations all relocated from London Gatwick Airport to London Luton Airport. The Airline continued to operate under the Flyjet Charter brand from Newcastle and Manchester Airports, with the SilverJet Scheduled brand flying from London Luton Airport. Newcastle and Manchester bases were closed in October 2007 and the two Boeing 757-200ERs (G-FJEA, G-FJEB) were returned to the leasing company, with the Boeing 767-200ER G-FJEC (which was then re-registered as G-SJET) being retained and operated by SilverJet.

Flyjet operated flights between RAF Brize Norton and RAF Akrotiri, Cyprus, on behalf of the Royal Air Force.

Destinations

The Airline operated services to holiday destinations such as Spain, Turkey, Greece, Cyprus, Canary Islands, Egypt, Africa, India the Middle East, the Far East and the Caribbean.

Destinations:
Iraq - Basra 
Cyprus - Larnaca, Paphos
Egypt - Sharm, Cairo
Ghana - Accra
Greece - Corfu
Hungary - Budapest
India - Amritsar
Ireland - Dublin, Shannon
Netherlands - Amsterdam
Portugal - Lisbon, Funchal, Faro
Spain - Tenerife Sur, Lanzarote, Malaga
Thailand - Phuket
Turkey - Ankara, Istanbul
United Kingdom Manchester, London-Luton, Glasgow

Fleet 

The Flyjet fleet consisted of the following aircraft (at January 2008):

2 Boeing 757-200ER
3 Boeing 767-200ER (operated on scheduled services as SilverJet)

See also
 List of defunct airlines of the United Kingdom

References

External links 

Flyjet
Flyjet Fleet Detail

Airlines established in 2002
Airlines disestablished in 2007
Defunct airlines of the United Kingdom
2002 establishments in the United Kingdom
2007 disestablishments in the United Kingdom